Leak is a 2000 Dutch thriller film written and directed by Jean van de Velde. The film was based on the book Sans Racune by ex-police officer Jan van Daalen and on a real-life Dutch police scandal from 1994.

Plot
Young police office Eddy is requested to turn his childhood friend Jack into a drugs informant.

Cast
 Cas Jansen as Eddy Dolstra
 Ricky Koole as Ria de Boer
 Thomas Acda as Franco
 Victor Löw as Sjakie Boon/Jack
 Gijs Scholten van Aschat as Ferdinand de Wit
 Ton Kas as Ben Haverman
 Jacob Derwig as Patrick
 Willem de Wolf as Murph

Awards
Golden Calf for:
 Best Feature Film
 Best Director : Jean van de Velde 
 Best Actor : Victor Löw
 Best Script : Jean van de Velde & Simon de Waal

References

External links
 
 
 

2000 films
2000 thriller films
Dutch thriller films
2000s Dutch-language films
Films directed by Jean van de Velde
Films shot in the Netherlands